V Day is an Irish COVID-19 documentary film, featuring the behind the scenes of Ireland's national COVID-19 vaccination campaign beginning in late February 2021, which shared the stories of relief and reunions from what was Ireland's largest vaccination campaign. Aired on 9 June 2021 on RTÉ One, it highlighted the extraordinary circumstances of frontline healthcare workers and all the people that made getting the vaccine possible.

Filmed from February to May 2021, the documentary began by following the journey of the over-85s who were the first to receive the vaccine. For older people and vulnerable younger people who were forced to cocoon at home, the vaccine offered a chance for freedom from loneliness and isolation, and the documentary told the stories of some of these people. It offered an honest look at how Ireland had fared over the course of the COVID-19 pandemic, and documented the beginning of the end of one of the deadliest pandemics in history.

The documentary affected viewers emotionally as it showed how people had survived the pandemic, while the Chief Executive of the Health Service Executive (HSE) Paul Reid tweeted that he felt such pride and emotion after watching the documentary, and that vaccines brought great joy and light back into so many real and ordinary people's lives.

References

External links
 V Day on RTÉ Player

2021 documentary films
2021 films
2021 television films
2021 in Irish television
COVID-19 pandemic in the Republic of Ireland
RTÉ original programming